SpiderOak is a US-based collaboration tool, online backup and file hosting service that allows users to access, synchronize and share data using a cloud-based server, offered by a company of the same name. Its first offering, its online backup service later branded "SpiderOak ONE", launched in December 2007. SpiderOak is accessible through an app for Windows, Mac and Linux computer platforms, and Android, N900 Maemo and iOS mobile platforms.

According to SpiderOak, the software uses encrypted cloud storage and client-side encryption key creation, so SpiderOak employees cannot access users' information. SpiderOak differentiates itself from its competition by this kind of encryption, in provision for syncing files and folders across multiple devices, and in automatic de-duplication of data.

Some components of SpiderOak are open-source; in 2009, the company announced its intent for the SpiderOak One client's code to be fully open-source in the future. , the SpiderOak One client's source code is only available open-source for mobile platforms, with no current plans to make the desktop client's code open-source. SpiderOak used to provide an open-source password manager named Encryptr, which was discontinued in March 2021. The source code for SpiderOak's group messaging application Semaphor is published to allow auditing.

History 
SpiderOak was founded in 2007 by Ethan Oberman and Alan Fairless as an encrypted private backup program. In 2013, SpiderOak began developing the Crypton framework, "a JavaScript framework for building applications where the server doesn't know the contents it's storing on behalf of users." Crypton is an open-source project allowing developers to easily add encryption security to mobile applications. By mid-2014, according to Oberman, SpiderOak had near 1 million users.

As of 2014, SpiderOak was headquartered in Chicago and employed 42 staff, headed by CEO Alan Fairless. Around the same time, the company had offices in Chicago and Kansas City, and was hiring remote employees inside and outside of the US. In 2015, SpiderOak raised $3.5 million in Series A funding, bringing its total funding to around $9 million.

In February 2017, SpiderOak discontinued using the phrase "zero knowledge" to describe their service following public criticism that the phrase conflicted with the mechanism behind cryptographic zero-knowledge proofs.  SpiderOak adopted the phrase "no knowledge" for their marketing.

In November 2017, founder Alan Fairless was replaced as CEO by Christopher Skinner, who announced that the company would be expanding into enterprise software, partially funded by a $2 million Series B round.

On August 1, 2018, the warrant canary on SpiderOak's website briefly vanished, followed by some system downtime. It was then replaced by a transparency report.  Five days later, the canary was re-signed using GPG encryption. By August 9, Spideroak had also updated their transparency report, making a statement concerning the canary. It is impossible to tell if the change was internally driven or canary was tripped and the company has been compelled by court order to hide the fact.

Main features 
 All data accessible in one de-duplicated location
 Configurable multi-platform synchronization
 Preserve all historical versions and deleted files
 Share folders in web ShareRooms with RSS notifications
 Retrieve files from any internet-connected device
 Claimed "no knowledge" data encryption if you only use the desktop client, that is, no sharing, web-access, or mobile access. This claim, however, cannot be confirmed due to the client being closed source
 Unlimited devices
 A combination of 2048-bit RSA and 256-bit AES

See also 
 Comparison of file hosting services
 Comparison of file synchronization software
 Comparison of online backup services
 File synchronization

References

External links 
 
 Review in Notebookreview
 MacLife Editors Choice Article
 
 Review in OnlineBackupDeals
 SpiderOak Review: Cloud Storage

File hosting
Data synchronization
Cross-platform software
Cloud storage
File hosting for Linux
File hosting for macOS
File hosting for Windows
Companies' terms of service